Transactional leadership or transactional management is the part of one style of leadership that focuses on supervision, organization, and  performance; it is an integral part of the Full Range Leadership Model. This type of management was born during the Industrial Revolution as a source of competitive advantage. Some typical tactics of this type of management include strategy, efficiency goals, economies of scale and quality differentiation. Transactional managers focus on performance related tasks and goals. It is effective for Managers in increasing the efficiency of conventional procedures, and able in handling new chaotic organizations, establishing and standardizing practices, processes, and behaviors.    

Transactional leadership is a style of leadership in which leaders promote compliance by followers through both rewards and punishments. Through a rewards and punishments system, transactional leaders are able to keep followers motivated for the short-term. Unlike transformational leaders, those using the transactional approach are less interested in progressing their workers talents. Transactional leadership "occurs when one person takes the initiative in making contact with others for the purpose of an exchange of valued things" (Burns, 1978). A transactional approach to leadership is not suitable for situations that require strong collaborations among individuals.

This type of leadership is effective in crisis and emergency situations, as well as for projects that need to be carried out in a specific way.

Transactional leadership is generally attributed to two factors. The leadership of the first conditional reward is viewed as both an efficient and constructive relationship between the leader and the followers. These followers get bonuses, merits, or recognition with the organization that they are with when they meet certain goals depending on what the company is (Bycio, P., Hackett, R.D., & Allen, J.S, 1995). The rewards, from this contingent reward, is solely based on an agreement between the leader and follower. The second factor of transactional leaders is management by exception. This can be active or passive. Active leaders are always watching to evaluate performances of employees. Passive management only assess after the task has been done and will only let you know about problems after they occurred (Howell & Aviolio, 1993).

Maslow's hierarchy of needs

Within the context of Maslow's hierarchy of needs, transactional leadership works at the basic levels of need satisfaction, where transformational leaders focus on the lower levels of the hierarchy.  Transactional leaders use an exchange model, with rewards being given for good work or positive outcomes.  Conversely, people with this leadership style also can punish poor work or negative outcomes, until the problem is corrected.  One way that transactional leadership focuses on lower level needs is by stressing specific task performance.  Transactional leaders are effective in getting specific tasks completed by managing each portion individually.

Transactional leaders are concerned with processes rather than forward-thinking ideas. Transactional leaders are generally split into three dimensions: contingent reward, management-by-exception: active, and management-by-exception: passive. The type of leader who focuses on contingent reward, also known as contingent positive reinforcement, give rewards when the set goals are accomplished on-time, ahead of time, or to keep subordinates working at a good pace at different times throughout completion.  Contingent rewards are also given when the employee engages in any desired behavior.   Often, contingent punishments are handed down on a management-by-exception basis, in which the exception is something going wrong.  Within management-by-exception, there are active and passive routes. Management-by-exception: active means that the leader continually monitors each subordinate's performance and takes immediate corrective action when something goes wrong. Management-by-exception: passive leaders do not monitor employee performance and wait for serious issues to come up before taking any corrective actions. In addition to the three dimensions of leadership above, another form of transactional leadership is recognized, the laissez-faire dimension. Laissez-faire leadership indicates a lack of leadership and a complete hands-off approach with employees.

With transactional leadership being applied to the lower-level needs and being more managerial in style, it is a foundation for transformational leadership which applies to higher-level needs.

Characteristics
Transactional leaders use reward and punishments to gain compliance from their followers. In any case, transactional leaders are not as concerned with the well-being of the workers as compared to transformational leadership. They are extrinsic motivators that bring minimal compliance from followers. They accept goals, structure, and the culture of the existing organization. Transactional leaders tend to be directive and action-oriented. Transformational leaders want followers to achieve intrinsic motivation and job fulfillment. 

Transactional leaders are willing to work within existing systems and negotiate to attain goals of the organization. They tend to think inside the box when solving problems. On the other hand, transformational leaders are pragmatic and think outside the box when solving problems.

Transactional leadership is primarily passive. On the other hand, transformational leadership is interactive and inspiring. The behaviors most associated with this type of leadership are establishing the criteria for rewarding followers and maintaining the status quo.

The overall effectiveness of transactional management is that it can be very practical and directive. Through transactional management, an explicit measure of success can be discovered through the consistent monitoring of managers. The model is also viewed as very straightforward and understandable due to the simple reward and punishments system. 

Within transactional leadership, there are two factors, contingent reward and management-by-exception. Contingent reward provides rewards for effort and recognizes good performance. Management-by-exception maintains the status quo, intervenes when subordinates do not meet acceptable performance levels, and initiates corrective action to improve performance.

The benefits of transactional leadership depend greatly on the circumstances – its benefits will not be realized in all situations. Where it can be useful, there are distinct advantages, but also some drawbacks. Some of the advantages include it rewards individuals who are self-motivated and follow instructions, its benefits tend to be realized quickly when quickly achieving short-term goals, workers have clearly defined rewards and penalties, it encourages productivity, it provides a clear and easy to understand structure, it is great for work environments where structure and systems need to be reproduced (e.g., high volume manufacturing), and it serves to align everyone in large organizations.

On the other hand, there are some down sides to transactional leadership: it does not work well in flexible work environments, it only rewards workers with perks or money, no other real motivators are used, it does not reward individuals who take personal initiative, it can be viewed as limiting and not personal, creativity by employees is limited or non-existent, the structures can be very rigid, and there is no room for flexibility with goals and objectives.

Transactional vs. transformational leadership
Transactional and transformational are the two modes of leadership that tend to be compared the most. James MacGregor Burns distinguished between transactional leaders and transformational by explaining that: transactional leaders are leaders who exchange tangible rewards for the work and loyalty of followers. Transactional leaders tend to be more passive as transformational leaders demonstrate active behaviors that include providing a sense of mission. Transformational leaders are leaders who engage with followers, focus on higher order intrinsic needs, and raise consciousness about the significance of specific outcomes and new ways in which those outcomes might be achieved.
Transformational leadership focuses on behavior; leadership is a charismatic interaction. "Transformational leaders do more with colleagues and followers than set up simple exchanges or agreements. They behave in ways to achieve superior results by employing one or more of the four core components of transformational leadership."   
Transactional leadership focuses on supervision and performance; leadership is a task-oriented transaction. Transactional can be active or passive. Active refers to leaders who actively monitor performance and take corrective actions when needed. Passive refers to leaders who do not actively monitor follower behavior and only take corrective action when serious problems arise. The two theories are said to be on the opposite ends of this spectrum. It turns out that transactional leadership does a better job with predicting the job itself, as opposed to transformational being best for the organization behavior (Afsar, B., Badir, Y.F., Saeed, B. B.,& Hafeez, S., 2017).

Components of transformational leadership
The four core components of transformational leadership are Idealized Influence, Inspirational Motivation, Intellectual Stimulation, and Individualized Consideration.

Multifactor leadership assessment
The multifactor leadership assessment identifies factors in the test taker's leadership style that help identify transactional vs transformational leaders. Individuals who score above 6/12 on contingent reward and management by exception exhibit tendencies to manage using positive and negative reinforcement, transactional management strategies.

Theory Y and Theory X
Douglas McGregor's Theory Y and Theory X can also be compared with these two leadership styles. Theory X can be compared with Transactional Leadership where managers need to rule by fear and consequences. In this style and theory, negative behavior is punished and employees are motivated through incentives.

Theory Y and Transformational Leadership are found to be similar, because the theory and style supports the idea that managers work to encourage their workers. Leaders assume the best of their employees. They believe them to be trusting, respectful, and self-motivated. The leaders help to supply the followers with tool they need to excel.

Examples
Coaches of athletic teams provide one example of transactional leadership.  These leaders motivate their followers by promoting the reward of winning the game.  They instil such a high level of commitment that their followers are willing to risk pain and injury to obtain the results that the leader is asking for.

Another example of transactional leadership is former US Senator from Wisconsin, Joseph McCarthy, and his ruthless style of accusing people of being Soviet spies during the Cold War.  By punishing for deviation from the rules and rewarding followers for bringing him accused communist infiltrators, McCarthy promoted results among followers.  This leadership style is especially effective in crisis situations, and another example of this type of leadership was Charles de Gaulle. Through this type of reward and punishment he was able to become the leader of the free French in a crisis situation.

See also

References

Further reading 

 
 
 
 

Leadership